

Men's tournament
The 2007 Men's Basketball Cup was contested by 10 teams and won by Petro Atlético. The final was played on May 9 and 12, 2006.

Preliminary rounds

Final round

Women's tournament
The 2007 Women's Basketball Cup was contested by three teams and won by Primeiro de Agosto.

Semi finals

Final

See also
 2007 Angola Basketball Super Cup
 2007 BAI Basket

References

Angola Basketball Cup seasons
Cup